The Akron RubberDucks minor league baseball franchise has played 29 seasons (all in the Eastern League; all as a Double-A affiliate of an MLB team) since its inception in Lynn, Massachusetts in the 1980 season. As of the completion of the 2008 season, the club has played in 4,067 regular season games and compiled a win–loss record of 2,164–1,903.  The team has also compiled a postseason win-loss record of 74–62 in 136 games.

Franchise history (1980–present)

Franchise totals (1980–present)

Notes
This column indicates wins and losses during the regular season and excludes any postseason play.
This column indicates position in the league standings.
This column indicates position in the divisional standings, if applicable.
Determined by finding the difference in wins plus the difference in losses divided by two, this column indicates "games behind" the team that finished in first place in the division.  From 1983 to 1993, when the Eastern League was not split into two divisions, this column indicates games behind the team that finished first place in the league.
This column indicates wins and losses during the postseason.

References
General
"Eastern League (1992–)." Baseball-Reference. 2008. Retrieved on October 31, 2008.

Specific

Seasons
Eastern League teams seasons
Akron RubberDucks seasons